The Binge is a 2020 American film directed by Jeremy Garelick and written by Jordan VanDina. A parody of The Purge, the film stars Skyler Gisondo, Eduardo Franco, Dexter Darden, Vince Vaughn, Grace Van Dien and Zainne Saleh.

The Binge was released in the United States on August 28, 2020, by Hulu. A sequel was released on December 9, 2022, by Hulu. A Chistmas-themed sequel, It’s a Wonderful Binge, was released in December 2022.

Synopsis

In a parody of The Purge, all alcohol and drugs are prohibited the entire year, except on the titular Binge, where alcohol and drugs are permitted for 12 hours.

Cast
 Skyler Gisondo as Griffin 
 Eduardo Franco as Andrew
 Dexter Darden as Hags
 Vince Vaughn as Principal Carleson 
 Grace Van Dien as Lena
 Zainne Saleh as Sarah
 Marta Piekarz as Kimmi
 Ian Soares as Mark 
 Zakary Odrzykowski as Student
 Joel Carlino as Student
 Hayes MacArthur as Pompano Mike
 Tony Cavalero as Pompano Mike
 Nicky Whelan as Punisher
 Nikki Leigh as Alexa
 Jasmine Millner as Student

Production
In September 2019, it was announced Skyler Gisondo, Eduardo Franco, Dexter Darden, Vince Vaughn, Grace Van Dien and Zainne Saleh had joined the cast of the film, with Jeremy Garelick directing from a screenplay by Jordan VanDina, with LD Entertainment and American High producing, and Hulu distributing.

Filming
Principal photography began in September 2019 in Syracuse, New York.

Release
The Binge was released on Hulu in the United-States on August 28, 2020.

Reception 
The website's critics consensus reads: "The Binge starts out with the promise of a fun time, but gets sloppy on bottom-shelf humor and stumbles face down into the gutter." On Metacritic, the film has a weighted average score of 35 out of 100, based on 10 critics, indicating "generally unfavorable reviews."

John DeFore of The Hollywood Reporter praised the performances of the cast, especially Vince Vaughn's part, despite stating that the characters have generally no outstanding or unusual characteristics, and that Jordan VanDina's script delivers absurdities, which leaves some questions unanswered. Bill Goodykoontz of The Arizona Republic rated the movie 3 out of 5 stars, found Vaughn's part as one of the best aspects of the film through the personality of his character, and praised the depiction of a strong friendship between the characters, but stated that the film still fails to deliver enough good jokes. Molly Freeman of Screen Rant gave rated the movie 2.5 out of 5 stars, found the premise of the movie quick and easy to apprehend, and complimented how the characters explore their world, but claimed that the film lacks an entertaining story, while finding the characters being undeveloped to be satisfying enough. Tomris Laffly of RogerEbert.com rated the film 2 out of 4 stars, praised the complicity between the main characters and the sense of humor of the movie, but stated that Vaughn's shy performance as the villain is barely remarkable, and that the movie does not deliver enough humorous scenes for a comedy film.

Sequel
A Chistmas-themed sequel, It’s a Wonderful Binge, was released in December 2022.

References

External links
  at Hulu
 

2020 films
2020s parody films
2020s satirical films
2020 black comedy films
Parodies of horror
American comedy films
American parody films
Films about drugs
Films directed by Jeremy Garelick
Films shot in New York (state)
Hulu original films
LD Entertainment films
2020s English-language films
2020s American films